Harley Desjarlais is a regional Métis leader in Canada. He is a former president of the Métis Provincial Council of British Columbia, today known as Métis Nation British Columbia. However, he was suspended from that position in September 2004 for unspecified reasons.

References

Indigenous leaders in British Columbia
Métis politicians
Living people
Canadian Métis people
Year of birth missing (living people)